The men's 100 metres event at the 2005 Asian Athletics Championships was held in Incheon, South Korea on September 1–2.

Medalists

Results

Heats
Wind: Heat 1: +0.1 m/s, Heat 2: +0.3 m/s, Heat 3: 0.0 m/s, Heat 4: +0.3 m/s

Semifinals
Wind: Heat 1: 0.0 m/s, Heat 2: -0.4 m/s

Final
Wind: -0.3 m/s

References
Results

2005 Asian Athletics Championships
100 metres at the Asian Athletics Championships